West of Cimarron is a 1941 American Western "Three Mesquiteers" B-movie directed by Lester Orlebeck and starring Bob Steele, Tom Tyler, and Rufe Davis.

Cast 
 Bob Steele as Tucson Smith
 Tom Tyler as Stony Brooke
 Rufe Davis as Lullaby Joslin
 Lois Collier as Doris Conway
 James Bush as Dr. Ken Morgan
 Guy Usher as Col. Conway
 Hugh Prosser as Charles Bentley
 Cordell Hickman as Rastus Brown
 Roy Barcroft as Capt. Hawks
 Budd Buster as Col. Grant Morgan

References

External links 

1941 films
1941 Western (genre) films
American Western (genre) films
American black-and-white films
Republic Pictures films
Three Mesquiteers films
Films directed by Lester Orlebeck
1940s English-language films
1940s American films